Narapati is a Sanskrit word meant king (literally man-lord).

Burmese 
Narapati was a Burmese royal title, and may refer to:

Kings 
 Sithu II:  King of Burma, r. 1174–1211
 Narapati I of Ava:  King of Ava, r. 1442–68
 Narapati II of Ava:  King of Ava, r. 1501–27
 Narapati of Prome: King of Prome, r. 1532–39
 Narapati III of Ava:  King of Ava, r. 1545–51
 Narapati IV of Ava:  King of Ava, r. 1551–55
 Narapati of Mrauk-U:  King of Arakan, r. 1638–45

Queens 
 Narapati Medaw: Chief vicereine of Prome, r. 1551–88

Javanese 

 Narapati Raja Śrī Sañjaya: King of Mataram

Burmese royal titles